The Municipal District of Acadia No. 34 is a municipal district (MD) in southern Alberta, Canada, east of  Calgary, close to the Saskatchewan border, in Census Division No. 4.

It is located on Highway 41 on the north side of the Red Deer River and bordered on the east by Saskatchewan. Highway 41 is a main route between Medicine Hat and Cold Lake.

Geography

Communities and localities 
 
The following urban municipalities are surrounded by the MD of Acadia No. 34.
Cities
none
Towns
none
Villages
none
Summer villages
none

The following hamlets are located within the MD of Acadia No. 34.
Hamlets
Acadia Valley (also recognized as a designated place by Statistics Canada)

The following localities are located within the MD of Acadia No. 34.
Localities 
Acadia
Arneson
Haven

Demographics 

In the 2016 Census of Population conducted by Statistics Canada, the MD of Acadia No. 34 had a population of 493 living in 159 of its 184 total private dwellings, a  change from its 2011 population of 495.

Attractions 
 Prairie Elevator Museum in the Hamlet of Acadia Valley
 Acadia Municipal Recreation Dam - trout fishing

See also 
List of communities in Alberta
List of municipal districts in Alberta

References

External links 

 
Acadia